Xeromantispa is a genus of mantidflies in the family Mantispidae. There is one described species in Xeromantispa, X. scabrosa.

References

Further reading

 
 
 

Hemerobiiformia
Articles created by Qbugbot